The Italian general election of 1946 took place on 2 June 1946.

The election was the first after the return of democracy. Christian Democracy (DC) was by far the largest party in Veneto (49.5%) and was especially strong in the provinces of Vicenza (61.1%), Padua (55.7%) and Treviso (53.5%). The Italian Socialist Party (PSI) came second (26.7%) and was stronger in the provinces of Rovigo (35.7%), Verona (33.3%) and Belluno (28.7%). The Italian Communist Party (PCI) was a distant third (13.6%), but came second in Rovigo (28.5%), where the parties of the left gained a large majority (56.5%). Rovigo, the southernmost province, was influenced by nearby "red" Emilia-Romagna.

Results

Constituent Assembly
Source: Regional Council of Veneto

Provincial breakdown
Source: Regional Council of Veneto

Elections in Veneto
General, Veneto